Somanés is a hamlet located in the municipality of Santa Cilia, in Huesca province, Aragon, Spain. As of 2020, it has a population of 15.

Geography 
Somanés is located 85km north-northwest of Huesca.

References

Populated places in the Province of Huesca